Kim Min-jun (born 12 February 2000) is a South Korean footballer currently playing as a forward for Gimcheon Sangmu.

Career statistics

Club

Notes

References

2000 births
Living people
University of Ulsan alumni
South Korean footballers
South Korea youth international footballers
Association football forwards
K League 1 players
Ulsan Hyundai FC players
Competitors at the 2019 Summer Universiade